The 41 județe and the municipality of Bucharest comprise the official administrative divisions of Romania. They also represent the European Union' s NUTS-3 geocode statistical subdivision scheme of Romania.

Overview

The earliest organization into județe of the Principalities of Wallachia, respectively ținuturi of Moldavia, dates back at least to the late 14th century. Each județ, respectively ținut, was ruled by a jude, respectively pârcălab, an officially appointed person who had administrative and judicial functions in a manner inspired from the organization of the late Byzantine Empire. Transylvania, when it was part of the historic Kingdom of Hungary (in the Middle Ages), an independent Principality or a Habsburg domain (in the modern era until World War I) was divided into royal counties (Latin: comitatus), headed by comes (royal counts) with administrative and judicial functions. The term județ started to be used in Romanian as a general term for all administrative divisions since the mid 19th century.

When modern Romania was formed in 1859 through the union of Wallachia and rump Moldavia, and then extended in 1918 through the union of Transylvania, as well as Bukovina and Bessarabia (parts of Moldavia temporarily acquired by respectively the Habsburgs, 1775–1918, and the Russian Tsars, 1812–1917), the administrative division was modernized using the French departments system as model. With the exception of the Communist period, this system remained in place. A prefect (from the Latin praefectus) is appointed for each județ. The prefect is the representative of the government in the county and the head of the local administration in the areas not devolved to local authorities. Until 1950, each județ was divided into a number of plăși (singular plasă), each administered by a pretor (from the Latin praetor), appointed by the prefect. Currently, Romania has no NUTS-4 units, the counties being composed directly of cities (with or without municipality status) and communes.

As in all modern democracies, the political power in Romania is divided into three independent branches: legislative, executive, and judicial. The prefect and his administration have only executive prerogatives. However, the territorial districts of the Romanian judicial system overlap with county borders, thus avoiding further complication. At the same time with local elections (of mayors and councilors for the cities and communes), a County Council (consiliu județean) is directly elected for each county, and, since 2008, the President of the County Council is also elected by direct vote. As of now, the legislative powers of county councils are quite reduced, but there are plans for more decentralization. (These plans, however, call for introduction of Regional Councils for the 8 development regions of the NUTS-2 level.)

Before World War I
As of 1872,  Romania was organized into 33 counties of which 17 were in Wallachia (12 in Muntenia and 5 in Oltenia), and 16 were in Moldavia (13 in western Moldavia and 3 in Southern Bessarabia: Cahul County, Bolgrad County, Ismail County).

After Independence, Romania lost Southern Bessarabia and received Northern Dobruja. The Romanian Old Kingdom was divided into 32 counties, with the following seats:

 Argeș County – Pitești
 Bacău County – Bacău
 Botoșani County – Botoșani
 Brăila County – Brăila
 Buzău County – Buzău
 Constanța County – Constanța
 Silistra Nouă County (1878–1879, merged into Constanța County) – Rasova/Cernavodă/Medgidia
 Covurlui County – Galați
 Dâmbovița County – Târgoviște
 Dolj County – Craiova
 Dorohoi County – Dorohoi
 Fălciu County – Huși
 Gorj County – Târgu Jiu
 Ialomița County – Călărași
 Iași County – Iași
 Ilfov County – București
 Mehedinți County – Turnu Severin
 Muscel County – Câmpulung
 Neamț County – Piatra Neamț
 Olt County – Slatina
 Prahova County – Ploiești
 Putna County – Focșani
 Râmnicu Sărat County – Râmnicu Sărat
 Roman County – Roman
 Romanați County – Caracal
 Suceava County – Fălticeni
 Tecuci County – Tecuci
 Teleorman County – Turnu Măgurele
 Tulcea County – Tulcea
 Tutova County – Bârlad
 Vaslui County – Vaslui
 Vâlcea County – Râmnicu Vâlcea
 Vlașca County – Giurgiu

After the Second Balkan War, Romania was awarded the southern part of Dobrudja, between the Danube, Beli Lom River, Kamchiya River, and the Black Sea, which was divided into two counties:
 Durostor County – Silistra
 Caliacra County – Bazargic

Interwar Romania

Between 1919 and 1925 the specifics of the administrative organization in the new territories were kept. It consisted of about 76 counties or parts of counties. In 1923 Romania adopted a new Constitution, and it unified the traditional administrative systems of Transylvania, Bukovina and Bessarabia with that of the Romanian Old Kingdom. County borders were kept largely intact, with only a couple minor adjustments. As a result of the 1925 administrative unification law, the territory was divided into 71 counties, 489 districts (plăși) and 8,879 communes.

Some of the 71 județe still exist today, a number were lost during World War II, and some became defunct. The latter ones are:
 Baia Countydivided between Neamț, Suceava and Iași
 Caraș Countymerged with Severin to form Caraș-Severin
 Câmpulung Countymerged with Suceava
 Ciuc Countymerged with Odorhei and renamed to Harghita
 Covurlui Countymerged into Galați
 Dorohoi Countymerged with Botoșani
 Făgăraș Countydivided between Brașov and Sibiu
 Fălciu Countymerged with Vaslui
 Ialomița Countydivided between Ialomița and Călărași
 Muscel Countymerged with Argeș
 Odorhei Countymerged with Ciuc and renamed to Harghita
 Putna Countyrenamed to Vrancea
 Rădăuți Countymerged with Suceava
 Râmnicu Sărat Countydivided between Vrancea, Buzău and Brăila
 Roman County merged with Neamț
 Romanați Countydivided between Dolj and Olt
 Severin Countymerged with Caraș to form Caraș-Severin
 Someș Countydivided between Maramureș County, Cluj, Sălaj and Bistrița-Năsăud
 Târnava Mică Countydivided between Alba, Sibiu and Mureș
 Târnava Mare Countydivided between Brașov, Sibiu and Mureș
 Tecuci Countydivided between Galați, Bacău and Vaslui
 Timiș-Torontal Countyrenamed to Timiș
 Trei Scaune Countyrenamed to Covasna
 Turda Countydivided between Cluj and Alba
 Tutova Countymerged with Vaslui
 Vlașca Countyrenamed to Giurgiu

Ținuturi: 1938–1940 

As a part of King Carol II's administrative reform of August 14, 1938, 10 regions (ținuturi) were created, which each included several of the existing 71 counties. The counties were preserved as administrative units, but the marrow of their prerogatives was conveyed to the news regions. Each region was headed by a regional governor (Rezident Regal), who supervised the county prefects, and each region had a regional council. The regional governor was appointed directly by the King.
The aim of the new regions was to connect poorer and richer counties and to break up the historical regions (Bessarabia, Bukovina, Transylvania etc.). However, the old regionalisms continued under the new brand (e.g. Transylvanian regionalism in Ținutul Mureș and Bukovinian regionalism in Ținutul Suceava).
The new regions were short-lived: all regions but Ținutul Olt and Ținutul Timiș had lost territory in September 1940, following the cession of Bessarabia and Northern Bukovina to the USSR, the Second Vienna Award and the Treaty of Craiova. After the fall of Carol II's personal regime (the so-called royal dictatorship) on September 6, 1940, the Ținuturi Timiș, Mureș, Mării, Dunărea de Jos, Prut and Suceava were restructured on September 16, 1940. All the regions were abolished only a couple of days latter, on September 22, 1940.
According to the Official Journal of August 14, 1938, the 10 regions and their capitals were the following:

Several regions had been given other names in the draft version of the Law (mentioned between brackets). All regions were named after rivers, except Ținutul Mării, i.e. the (Black) Sea Region, and Ținutul Bucegi, called after the Bucegi Mountains.

World War II changes

Bessarabia
After the recovery of Bessarabia, the Bessarabia Governorate with capital at Chișinău was established in 1941 and existed until 1944. It included the counties of  Bălți, Cetatea Albă, Cahul, Chilia (newly-established), Ismail, Lăpușna, Orhei, Soroca and Tighina.

Bukovina
Following the recapture of Northern Bukovina, the Bukovina Governorate with capital at Cernăuți (Chernivtsi) existed from 1941 to 1944. It included the counties of Câmpulung, Cernăuți, Dorohoi, Hotin, Rădăuți, Storojineț and Suceava.

Administration of Transnistria (1941–1944)

This territory was administered by Romania briefly in 1941–1944, when the country was governed by a military dictatorship allied with Nazi Germany. It consisted of formerly proper Soviet territory between Dniester and Southern Bug rivers. Nowadays, most of it is in Ukraine, with small parts in the Republic of Moldova (Transnistria). This territory was kept under Romanian military occupation, and was not annexed by Romania. It was divided into 13 counties:

Lost during and after the war
To Bulgaria
In 1913, as a result of the Second Balkan War, Romania acquired Southern Dobruja from Bulgaria, annexing this historical region within Romania's borders. In 1940, Nazi Germany and Fascist Italy forced Romania to return it to Bulgaria (see Treaty of Craiova). Romania did not reclaim this area neither after the end of World War II nor at the fall of communism.  
 Caliacra (now Dobrich Province, Bulgaria)
 Durostor (now Silistra Province, Bulgaria)

To the Soviet Union
In 1940, Soviet Union occupied Bessarabia, northern Bukovina, and the Hertsa region (the latter part of Dorohoi County in a rump Moldavia). Since the fall of the Soviet Union in 1991, these territories have been part of the newly independent Moldova and Ukraine.

in Moldova
Bălți County
Cahul County
southern half of Hotin County
Orhei County
Lăpușna County
Soroca County
Tighina County
a small part of Ismail County
a small part of Cetatea Albă County

in Ukraine
Cernăuți County
largest part of Cetatea Albă County
Hertsa region (a small part of Dorohoi County)
northern half of Hotin County
largest part of Ismail County
part of Rădăuți County
Storojineț County

Communist Romania

People's Republic of Romania

In 1951, the Romanian Workers' Party changed the administrative division of Romania to the Soviet model (regions and raions), but reverted to the county system in 1968, although county borders were quite different from the interwar period. A small adjustment was performed in 1981: former counties of Ilfov and Ialomița were reorganized into the present-day counties of Giurgiu, Călărași, Ialomița and Ilfov.

A new law on the administrative division from September 6, 1950, abolished the 58 remaining counties (as well as the 424 plăși and the 6,276 urban and rural communes), replacing them with 28 regions composed of 177 raions, 148 cities and 4,052 communes. In 1952 the number of regions was reduced to 18: Arad, Bacău, Baia Mare, Bârlad, București, Cluj, Constanța, Craiova, Galați, Hunedoara, Iași, Oradea, Pitești, Ploiești, Stalin, Suceava, Timișoara, and for the first time and autonomous administrative unit based on ethnic criteria, Magyar Autonomous Region (Regiunea Autonomă Maghiară). In 1956 the regions of Arad and Bârlad were also dismantled. In 1960, the Hungarian autonomous unit was renamed to Regiunea Mureș-Autonomă Maghiară (Mureș-Hungarian Autonomous Region) along with changes in its territory. The final number of regions was 16.

Socialist Republic of Romania
In February 1968, the old administrative division of județ was reinstated. On January 14, 1968 the law proposal included 35 counties. The final result was substantially different from the situation existent before 1950. This included 39 counties, municipality of Bucharest, 236 cities, out of which 47 were municipalities, and 2706 communes comprising 13149 villages. There were several reasons for restoring the județe. For one, the Nicolae Ceaușescu regime wished to distance itself from the Soviet Union, and discarding the Soviet administrative model was a means of achieving that. For another, the regime had a nationalist outlook, and bringing back an old Romanian system fit with the prevailing ideology. Finally, during his first years, Ceaușescu was preoccupied with replacing functionaries named by his predecessor Gheorghe Gheorghiu-Dej and creating his own power base; dismissing the regional administrations and naming his own county officials was a step in that process.

Current situation

In 1981 the Ilfov County was divided into a so-called "Agricultural Sector" of Ilfov (Sectorul Agricol Ilfov) and the newly created Giurgiu County, and Călărași County was created by detaching the southern part of the Ialomița County. The county borders introduced in 1968 are largely in place at present, but administrative reforms during the 1990s have devolved the functions of different authorities in line with transition from a totalitarian communist system to a modern democracy. The only territorial adjustment after 1989 occurred in 1995, when Ilfov County was formed out of the so-called "agricultural sector" of the Municipality of Bucharest (Sectorul Agricol Ilfov). With Romania's integration into the European structures, its counties became NUTS level 3 divisions of the European Union. Currently, Romania is divided into 41 counties and the Municipality of Bucharest.

Future developments

As of 2010–2011 there have been several proposals for the administrative reorganization of Romania made by the presidential commission tasked with the analysis of the current political and constitutional system. Most of these recommendations aim for the partial reestablishment of the counties in their pre-1950 form (NUTS III level). If this reform were adopted, the counties would be grouped into several regions (9 to 15) based on common historical and economic characteristics (NUTS II level). The regions will be in their turn clustered into 4–6 macroregions (NUTS I level). Furthermore, a NUTS IV level division, called plasă or canton, would probably be added in order to meet the EU statistical and administrative requirements.

Another proposal, based on 15 autonomous euro-regions (amongst them one ethnic-based region with a consistent Hungarian majority consisting of the existing Mureș, Harghita and Covasna counties) grouped into 5 statistical macroregions (NUTS I), was made by the Democratic Union of Hungarians in Romania.

In 2018, a name referendum was held in the Olt County to rename it to "Olt-Romanați County" in memory of the former Romanați County, but it did not reach the required turnout and therefore failed.

See also 
 List of cities in Romania
 Etymological list of counties of Romania
 Communes of Romania
 Municipality in Romania

References

External links
Portretul României Interbelice

 Historical
Subdivisions of Romania
Romania geography-related lists
Administrative divisions